Amit Kaushik Shah (born 1981) is a British actor.

Early life 
Amit Shah was born in Enfield, England. Shah's parents were originally from Kenya, and his grandparents from Gujarat, India. His father is an accountant, and his mother is a health-food shop manager. Shah was cast as the lead in a school play at the age of 16. He read drama at Staffordshire University and then went on to train at the London Academy of Music and Dramatic Art in West London. In 2003 he was given permission by the principal to graduate early so that he could begin rehearsals for Bombay Dreams, a West-End musical produced by Andrew Lloyd Webber.

Acting career 
In 2006, Shah was offered a part in The Royal Hunt of the Sun at the National Theatre; the same part that Derek Jacobi played in the original production in 1964. He stayed on at the National Theatre to perform three plays, including The Alchemist directed by Nicholas Hytner, for which he was nominated for an Ian Charleson Award. He also portrayed a principal role in The Man of Mode, alongside Tom Hardy, Rory Kinnear and Hayley Atwell.

Shah has starred in a variety of television shows since 2006. His most notable roles include Sunny in BBC One's Hospital People, Fred in Channel 4's Crashing, and Torque in The Witcher for Netflix.

Shah's first major part in a feature film was in 2014 for The Hundred-Foot Journey in which he starred alongside Helen Mirren and Om Puri. He has since been cast in Johnny English Strikes Again, Ordinary Love, and Last Christmas.

Filmography

Film

Television

Theatre

References 
 Amit Shah interview on easterneye.biz
 Amit Shah interview re his character  Jeremy in The Rebel.
 Amit Shah's Troika page

External links 
 
 

1981 births
Living people
21st-century British male actors
Alumni of Staffordshire University
Alumni of the London Academy of Music and Dramatic Art
British male actors of Indian descent
British male film actors
British male stage actors
British male television actors
English people of Kenyan descent
Male actors from London
People from the London Borough of Enfield